State of the Planet is a three-part environmental documentary series, made by the BBC Natural History Unit, transmitted in November 2000. It is written and presented by David Attenborough, and produced by Rupert Barrington. It includes interviews with many leading scientists, such as Edward O. Wilson and Jared Diamond. Each of the programmes attempts to find answers to the potential ecological crisis that threatens the Earth.

The series was specially commissioned by BBC One for the millennium, and had a budget of around GBP2 million. The BBC drew criticism for scheduling the first episode in competition with the final part of ITV's Inspector Morse; as a consequence, it drew just 4 million viewers, well below the channel's typical share. However, ratings recovered to around 7 million for the second and third programmes.

Attenborough fronted this series in between presenting his 1998 ornithological study, The Life of Birds, and providing narration to the award-winning 2001 series The Blue Planet.

Programmes

1. "Is There a Crisis?" 
Together with leading experts, David Attenborough examines the latest scientific evidence in order to discover if the planet's ecosystems are really in crisis. If so, he asks how it could have come about, and what is so different now that prevents certain species from adapting to survive, as they did in the past?

2. "Why Is There a Crisis?" 
Attenborough presents some stark facts. He states that humans are now triggering a mass extinction on a similar scale to that which wiped out the dinosaurs – but at an unprecedented rate. He investigates the five main activities of mankind that are the most likely contributory factors:

 Habitat loss
 Introduced species
 Pollution
 Over-harvesting
 Islandisation

3. "The Future of Life" 
As Homo sapiens relentlessly encroaches on the natural world and its inhabitants, the viewer is presented with a choice: leave behind a flourishing planet or a dying one.

DVD 
The complete series was released on DVD (BBCDVD1498) on 27 September 2004.

References

External links 
 
 
 

2000 British television series debuts
2000 British television series endings
BBC television documentaries